Andersson Nunatak is a nunatak  west of Sheppard Point, standing above the coastal ice cliffs on the north shore of Hope Bay, at the northeast end of the Antarctic Peninsula. It was discovered by Johan Gunnar Andersson's party of the Swedish Antarctic Expedition which wintered at Hope Bay in 1903, and was named for Andersson by the Falkland Islands Dependencies Survey following their survey of the area in 1945.

See also
Andersson Peak
List of nunataks

References 

Nunataks of Trinity Peninsula